The Crugan Mudstone is a geologic formation in England. It preserves fossils dating back to the Ordovician period.

See also

 List of fossiliferous stratigraphic units in England

References
 

Geologic formations of England
Ordovician System of Europe
Ordovician England
Mudstone formations